Simon Morden is an English science fiction author, best known for his Philip K. Dick Award–winning Metrozone series of novels set in post-apocalyptic London.

Biography
Morden was educated as a scientist, attaining a BSc (Hons) in Geology from the University of Sheffield and his PhD in Geophysics from Newcastle University.

Morden has worked in a variety of roles including a school caretaker, an admin assistant, a personal assistant to a financial advisor and is currently a teaching assistant for a design technology class at a primary school in Gateshead. In terms of his writing career, Morden is the former editor of Focus magazine; he has been on the Arthur C. Clarke Award judging panel; and he's a regular speaker on Christian matters in fiction at the Greenbelt Festival. Morden identifies as a Christian.

Morden first achieved success as a writer when his novel Heart was published by Razorblade Press in 2002.

His writing influences include Charles Stross, Ray Bradbury, Julian May, and Michael Marshall Smith

Bibliography

The Metrozone series
 Equations of Life (2011, Orbit)
 Theories of Flight (2011, Orbit)
 Degrees of Freedom (2011, Orbit)
 The Curve of the Earth (2013, Orbit)

The Down series
 Down Station (February 2016)
 The White City (2016, Gollancz)

The Frank Kittridge series
 One Way (April 2018, Orbit)
 No Way (February 2019, Orbit)

Stand-alone works
 Heart (2002, Razorblade)
 Another War (novella) (2005, Telos)
 The Lost Art (2007, David Fickling)
 Arcanum (19 November 2013, Orbit)
 At The Speed Of Light (January 2017, Newcon Press)
 Bright Morning Star (2019)
 Gallowglass (as S.J. Morden) (December 2020, Gollancz)
 The Red Planet - a natural history of Mars (2021 Elliott and Thompson Ltd)
 The Flight Of The Aphrodite (as S.J. Morden) (November 2022, Gollancz)

Collections
 Thy Kingdom Come (Multimedia disc) (2002, Lone Wolf Publications)
 Thy Kingdom Come (Limited edition hardback) (2013, Jurassic London)
 Brilliant Things (2004, Subway)

Awards
 2006 World Fantasy Award, Best Novella shortlist, Another War
 2009 Catalyst Book Award for teen fiction, shortlist, The Lost Art
 2012 Arthur C. Clarke Award, longlist, Equations of Life
 2012 Philip K. Dick Award, overall winner, The Samuil Petrovitch Trilogy
 2013 BSFA Award for Best Artwork, shortlist, Thy Kingdom Come

References

External links

English science fiction writers
Living people
21st-century British novelists
British male novelists
Christian novelists
People associated with the University of Sheffield
People associated with Newcastle University
21st-century English male writers
Year of birth missing (living people)